Beaver Brook is a  river located in New Hampshire and Massachusetts in the United States.  It is a tributary of the Merrimack River, part of the Gulf of Maine watershed.

Beaver Brook rises in Chester, New Hampshire, and flows south into Derry, passing through Harantis Lake, Adams Pond, and Beaver Lake.  Continuing south, the brook forms the boundary between Londonderry and Windham, then flows through Pelham. The brook crosses the state line into Dracut, Massachusetts, and reaches the Merrimack River in the city of Lowell.

Most of the brook's course is through gently hilly terrain that is rapidly being converted into suburban land use.

See also

List of rivers of Massachusetts
List of rivers of New Hampshire

References

Rivers of Middlesex County, Massachusetts
Rivers of New Hampshire
Tributaries of the Merrimack River
Rivers of Massachusetts
Rivers of Rockingham County, New Hampshire
Rivers of Hillsborough County, New Hampshire